Bichota World Tour is the third concert tour by Colombian singer Karol G in support of her third studio album, KG0516 (2021). Sponsored by AEG Live, it has visited auditoriums, indoor arenas and stadiums across North America and Latin America. The tour started on October 27, 2021, in Denver, and will conclude on March 12, 2023 in San Juan, Puerto Rico.

It grossed a total of $30.6 million and sold 471,000 tickets on its first 46 shows as part of the "Bichota Tour" and the extension version of the show named "Strip Love" grossed another $72.2 million and sold 413,000 tickets in 33 shows.

Set list 
This set list is representative of the show on June 11, 2022, in Mexico City. It is not representative of all concerts for the duration of the tour.

"Sejodioto"
"Mi Cama"
"Poblado"
"Ay, Dios Mio!"
"Gato Malo"
Act 1
"Pineapple"
"El Barco"
"Creéme"
"A Ella"
"Friki"
"Location"
"El Makinon"
"Culpables"
"Secreto"
"Ahora Me Llama"
"Salvame" 
Act 2
"Ocean"
"Mamiii"
"Leyendas"
"Don't Be Shy"
"200 Copas"
"Bichota"
"Tusa"
Encore
"Provenza"

Shows

Notes

References 

2021 concert tours
2022 concert tours
Concert tours of North America
Concert tours of the United States
Concert tours of Canada
Concert tours of Mexico
Concert tours of South America